Mexico competed at the 2013 Summer Universiade in Kazan, Russia from 6 to 17 July 2013.

Medalists

Medals by sport

Nations at the 2013 Summer Universiade
Mexico at the Summer Universiade